Bucoides is a genus of longhorn beetles of the subfamily Lamiinae, containing the following species:

 Bucoides erichsoni Martins, 1979
 Bucoides exotica Martins & Galileo, 1990
 Bucoides montana Martins & Galileo, 2009

References

Onciderini